Prolimacodes lilalia is a moth in the family Limacodidae. It was described by Harrison Gray Dyar Jr. in 1937. It is found in French Guiana.

References

Arctiidae genus list at Butterflies and Moths of the World of the Natural History Museum

Limacodidae
Moths described in 1937
Taxa named by Harrison Gray Dyar Jr.
Moths of South America